Livingston Municipal Airport  is a city-owned public-use airport located two miles (3 km) northeast of the central business district of Livingston, a city in Overton County, Tennessee, United States.

Facilities and aircraft 
For the 12-month period ending February 26, 1999, the airport had 10,570 aircraft operations, an average of 28 per day: 99.6% general aviation and 0.4% military. At that time there were 14 aircraft based at this airport: 93% single-engine and 7% multi-engine.

References

External links 
 LIVINGSTON MUNICIPAL - 8A3 at Tennessee DOT
 

Airports in Tennessee
Buildings and structures in Overton County, Tennessee
Transportation in Overton County, Tennessee